The theory of functions of several complex variables is the branch of mathematics dealing with complex-valued functions. The name of the field dealing with the properties of function of several complex variables is called several complex variables (and analytic space), that has become a common name for that whole field of study and Mathematics Subject Classification has, as a top-level heading. A function  is -tuples of complex numbers, classically studied on the complex coordinate space .

As in complex analysis of functions of one variable, which is the case , the functions studied are holomorphic or complex analytic so that, locally, they are power series in the variables . Equivalently, they are locally uniform limits of polynomials; or locally square-integrable solutions to the -dimensional Cauchy–Riemann equations. For one complex variable, every domain(), is the domain of holomorphy of some function, in other words every domain has a function for which it is the domain of holomorphy. For several complex variables, this is not the case; there exist domains that are not the domain of holomorphy of any function, and so is not always the domain of holomorphy, so the domain of holomorphy is one of the themes in this field. Patching the local data of meromorphic functions, i.e. the problem of creating a global meromorphic function from zeros and poles, is called the Cousin problem.

Historical perspective 

Many examples of such functions were familiar in nineteenth-century mathematics; abelian functions, theta functions, and some hypergeometric series, and also, as an example of an inverse problem; the Jacobi inversion problem. Naturally also same function of one variable that depends on some complex parameter is a candidate. The theory, however, for many years didn't become a full-fledged field in mathematical analysis, since its characteristic phenomena weren't uncovered. The Weierstrass preparation theorem would now be classed as commutative algebra; it did justify the local picture, ramification, that addresses the generalization of the branch points of Riemann surface theory.

With work of Friedrich Hartogs, E. E. Levi, and of Kiyoshi Oka in the 1930s, a general theory began to emerge; others working in the area at the time were Heinrich Behnke, Peter Thullen, Karl Stein, Wilhelm Wirtinger and Francesco Severi. Hartogs proved some basic results, such as every isolated singularity is removable, for every analytic function 

whenever . Naturally the analogues of contour integrals will be harder to handle; when  an integral surrounding a point should be over a three-dimensional manifold (since we are in four real dimensions), while iterating contour (line) integrals over two separate complex variables should come to a double integral over a two-dimensional surface. This means that the residue calculus will have to take a very different character.

After 1945 important work in France, in the seminar of Henri Cartan, and Germany with Hans Grauert and Reinhold Remmert, quickly changed the picture of the theory. A number of issues were clarified, in particular that of analytic continuation. In fact the D of that kind are rather special in nature (especially in complex coordinate spaces  and Stein manifolds, satisfying a condition called pseudoconvexity). The natural domains of definition of functions, continued to the limit, are called Stein manifolds and their nature was to make sheaf cohomology groups vanish, also, the property that the sheaf cohomology group disappears is also found in other high-dimensional complex manifolds, indicating that the Hodge manifold is projective. In fact it was the need to put (in particular) the work of Oka on a clearer basis that led quickly to the consistent use of sheaves for the formulation of the theory (with major repercussions for algebraic geometry, in particular from Grauert's work).

From this point onwards there was a foundational theory, which could be applied to analytic geometry,  automorphic forms of several variables, and partial differential equations. The deformation theory of complex structures and complex manifolds was described in general terms by Kunihiko Kodaira and D. C. Spencer. The celebrated paper GAGA of Serre pinned down the crossover point from géometrie analytique to géometrie algébrique.

C. L. Siegel was heard to complain that the new theory of functions of several complex variables had few functions in it, meaning that the special function side of the theory was subordinated to sheaves. The interest for number theory, certainly, is in specific generalizations of modular forms. The classical candidates are the Hilbert modular forms and Siegel modular forms. In a sense this doesn't contradict Siegel; the modern theory has its own, different directions.

Subsequent developments included the hyperfunction theory, and the edge-of-the-wedge theorem, both of which had some inspiration from quantum field theory. There are a number of other fields, such as Banach algebra theory, that draw on several complex variables.

The complex coordinate space 
Hence, as a set and as a topological space,  may be identified to the real coordinate space  and its topological dimension is thus .

In coordinate-free language, any vector space over complex numbers may be thought of as a real vector space of twice as many dimensions, where a complex structure is specified by a linear operator  (such that ) which defines multiplication by the imaginary unit .

Any such space, as a real space, is oriented. On the complex plane thought of as a Cartesian plane, multiplication by a complex number  may be represented by the real matrix

with determinant

Likewise, if one expresses any finite-dimensional complex linear operator as a real matrix (which will be composed from 2 × 2 blocks of the aforementioned form), then its determinant equals to the square of absolute value of the corresponding complex determinant. It is a non-negative number, which implies that the (real) orientation of the space is never reversed by a complex operator.

Connected space 
Every product of a family of an connected (resp. path-connected) spaces is connected (resp. path-connected).

Compact 
From the Tychonoff's theorem, the space mapped by the cartesian product consisting of any combination of compact spaces is a compact space.

Holomorphic functions

Definition 

When a function f defined on the domain D is complex-differentiable at each point on D, f is said to be holomorphic on D. When the function f defined on the domain D satisfies the following conditions, it is complex-differentiable at the point  on D;

Let ,

, since such  are uniquely determined, they are called the partial differential coefficients of f, and each are written as 

Therefore, when a function f is holomorphic on the domain , then f satisfies the following two conditions.

 f is continuous on D 
f is holomorphic in each variable separately, that is f is separate holomorphicity, namely,

On the converse, when these conditions are satisfied, the function f is holomorphic (as described later), and this condition is called Osgood's lemma. However, note that condition (B) depends on the properties of the domain (as described later).

Cauchy–Riemann equations 
For each index ν let

and 
 (Wirtinger derivative)

Then as expected,

When, 

then,

therefore,

This satisfies the Cauchy–Riemann equation of one variable to each index ν, then f is a separate holomorphic.

Cauchy's integral formula I (Polydisc version) 
Prove the sufficiency of two conditions (A) and (B). Let f meets the conditions of being continuous and separately homorphic on domain D. Each disk has a rectifiable curve ,  is piecewise smoothness, class  Jordan closed curve. Let  be the domain surrounded by each . Also, take the closed polydisc  so that it becomes . ( and let  be the center of each disk.) Using the Cauchy's integral formula of one variable repeatedly, 

 

Because  is a rectifiable Jordanian closed curve and f is continuous, so the order of products and sums can be exchanged so the iterated integral can be calculated as a multiple integral. Therefore,

Cauchy's evaluation formula 
Because the order of products and sums is interchangeable, from  we get

f is class -function.

 

Therefore, Liouville's theorem hold.

Power series expansion of holomorphic functions on polydisc 
If function f is holomorphic, on polydisc , from the Cauchy's integral formula, we can see that it can be uniquely expanded to the next power series.

In addition, f that satisfies the following conditions is called an analytic function.

For each point ,  is expressed as a power series expansion that is convergent on D :

 

We have already explained that holomorphic functions on polydisc are analytic. Also, from the theorem derived by Weierstrass , we can see that the analytic function on polydisc (convergent power series) is holomorphic.

If a sequence of functions  which converges uniformly on compacta inside a domain D, the limit function f of  also uniformly on compacta inside a domain D. Also, respective partial derivative of  also compactly converges on domain D to the corresponding derivative of f.

Radius of convergence of power series 

In this way it is possible to have a similar, combination of radius of convergence for a one complex variable. This combination is generally not unique and there are an infinite number of combinations.

Laurent series expansion 
Let  be holomorphic in the annulus  and continuous on their circumference, then there exists the following expansion ;

Bochner–Martinelli formula (Cauchy's integral formula II) 

The Cauchy integral formula holds only for polydiscs, and in the domain of several complex variables, polydiscs are only one of many domain, so we introduce the Bochner–Martinelli formula.

In particular if f is holomorphic the second term vanishes, so

Identity theorem 
When the function f,g is analytic in the domain D, even for several complex variables, the identity theorem holds on the domain D, because it has a power series expansion the neighbourhood of point of analytic. Therefore, the maximal principle hold. Also, the inverse function theorem and implicit function theorem hold. For a generalized version of the implicit function theorem to complex variables, see the Weierstrass preparation theorem

Biholomorphism 
From the establishment of the inverse function theorem, the following mapping can be defined.

For the domain U, V of the n-dimensional complex space , the bijective holomorphic function  and the inverse mapping  is also holomorphic. At this time,  is called a U, V biholomorphism also, we say that U and V are biholomorphically equivalent or that they are biholomorphic.

The Riemann mapping theorem does not hold 
When , open balls and open polydiscs are not biholomorphically equivalent, that is, there is no biholomorphic mapping between the two. This was proven by Poincaré in 1907 by showing that their automorphism groups have different dimensions as Lie groups. However, even in the case of several complex variables, there are some results similar to the results of the theory of uniformization in one complex variable.

Analytic continuation 
If  then f is said to be connected to V, and g is said to be analytic continuation of f. From the identity theorem, if g exists, for each way of choosing w it is unique. Whether or not the definition of this analytic continuation is well-defined should be considered whether the domains U, V and W can be defined arbitrarily. When n > 2, the following phenomenon occurs depending on the shape of the boundary : there exists V, W such that arbitrary holomorphic functions  over the domain U have an analytic continuation . In other words, there may be not exist function  such that  as the natural boundary. There is called the Hartogs's phenomenon. Therefore, researching when domain boundaries become natural boundaries has become one of the main research themes of several complex variables.

Reinhardt domain 
In polydisks, the Cauchy's integral formula holds and the power series expansion of holomorphic functions is defined, but the unique radius of convergence is not defined for each variable. Also, since the Riemann mapping theorem does not hold, polydisks and open unit balls are not biholomorphic mapping, and also, polydisks was possible to separation of variables, but it doesn't always hold for any domain. Therefore, in order to study of the domain of convergence of the power series, it was necessary to make additional restriction on the domain, this was the Reinhardt domain. Early Knowledge into the properties of field of study of several complex variables, such as Logarithmically-convex, Hartogs's extension theorem, etc. , were given in the Reinhardt domain.

 

 

A Reinhardt domain D is called a complete Reinhardt domain if together with all point  it also contains the polydisc

 

A complete Reinhardt domain D is star-like with respect to its centre a. Therefore, the complete Reinhardt domain is simply connected, also when the complete Reinhardt domain is the boundary line, there is a way to prove the Cauchy's integral theorem without using the Jordan curve theorem.

Logarithmically-convex 
A Reinhardt domain D is called logarithmically convex if the image  of the set

 

under the mapping

 

is a convex set in the real coordinate space .

Some results

Hartogs's extension theorem and Hartogs's phenomenon 

On the polydisk consisting of two disks  when .

Internal domain of 

It is also called Osgood–Brown theorem is that for holomorphic functions of several complex variables, the singularity is a accumulation point, not an isolated point. This means that the various properties that hold for holomorphic functions of one-variable complex variables do not hold for holomorphic functions of several complex variables. The nature of these singularities is also derived from Weierstrass preparation theorem. A generalization of this theorem using the same method as Hartogs was proved in 2007.

Looking at this from the perspective of the Reinhardt domain,  is the Reinhardt domain containing the center z = 0, and the domain of convergence of  has been extended to the smallest complete Reinhardt domain  containing .

Thullen's classic results 

Thullen's classical result says that a 2-dimensional bounded Reinhard domain containing the origin is biholomorphic to one of the following domains provided that the orbit of the origin by the automorphism group has positive dimension:

  (polydisc);
  (unit ball);
  (Thullen domain).

Sunada's results 
Toshikazu Sunada (1978) established a generalization of Thullen's result:

Natural domain of the holomorphic function (domain of holomorphy) 
When moving from the theory of one complex variable to the theory of several complex variables, depending on the range of the domain, it may not be possible to define a holomorphic function such that the boundary of the domain becomes a natural boundary. Considering the domain where the boundaries of the domain are natural boundaries (In the complex coordinate space  call the domain of holomorphy), the first result of the domain of holomorphy was the holomorphic convexity of H. Cartan and Thullen. Levi's problem shows that the pseudoconvex domain was a domain of holomorphy. Kiyoshi Oka's notion of idéal de domaines indéterminés is interpreted theory of sheaf cohomology by 
H. Cartan and more development Serre. In sheaf cohomology, the domain of holomorphy has come to be interpreted as the theory of Stein manifolds. The notion of the domain of holomorphy is also considered in other complex manifolds, furthermore also the complex analytic space which is its generalization.

Domain of holomorphy 

When a function f is holomorpic on the domain  and cannot directly connect to the domain outside D, including the point of the domain boundary , the domain D is called the domain of holomorphy of f and the boundary is called the natural boundary of f. In other words, the domain of holomorphy D is the supremum of the domain where the holomorphic function f is holomorphic, and the domain D, which is holomorphic, cannot be extended any more. For several complex variables, i.e. domain , the boundaries may not be natural boundaries. Hartogs' extension theorem gives an example of a domain where boundaries are not natural boundaries.

For the  case, the every domain was the domain of holomorphy; we can define a holomorphic function with zeros accumulating everywhere on the boundary of the domain, which must then be a natural boundary for a domain of definition of its reciprocal.

Properties of the domain of holomorphy 
 If  are domains of holomorphy, then their intersection  is also a domain of holomorphy.
 If  is an increasing sequence of domains of holomorphy, then their union  is also a domain of holomorphy (see Behnke–Stein theorem).

Holomorphically convex hull 
Let  be a domain , or alternatively for a more general definition, let  be an  dimensional complex analytic manifold. Further let  stand for the set of holomorphic functions on G. For a compact set , the holomorphically convex hull of K is

One obtains a narrower concept of polynomially convex hull by taking  instead to be the set of complex-valued polynomial functions on G. The polynomially convex hull contains the holomorphically convex hull.

The domain  is called holomorphically convex if for every compact subset  is also compact in G. Sometimes this is just abbreviated as holomorph-convex.

When , if f satisfies the above holomorphic convexity on D it has the following properties.  for every compact subset K in D, where
Also, at this time, D is a domain of holomorphy. Therefore, every convex domain  is domain of holomorphy.

Pseudoconvexity 
Hartogs showed that 

If such a relations holds in the domain of holomorphy of several complex variables, it looks like a more manageable condition than a holomorphically convex. The subharmonic function looks like a kind of convex function, so it was named by Levi as a pseudoconvex domain (Hartogs's pseudoconvexity). Pseudoconvex domain are important, as they allow for classification of domains of holomorphy.

Definition of plurisubharmonic function 
A function

with domain 
is called plurisubharmonic if it is upper semi-continuous, and for every complex line

 with 

the function  is a subharmonic function on the set

In full generality, the notion can be defined on an arbitrary complex manifold or even a Complex analytic space  as follows. An upper semi-continuous function

is said to be plurisubharmonic if and only if for any holomorphic map
 the function

is subharmonic, where  denotes the unit disk.

There fore, if  is of class , then  is plurisubharmonic if and only if the hermitian matrix  is positive semidefinite.

Equivalently, a -function u is plurisubharmonic if and only if  is a positive (1,1)-form.

Strictly plurisubharmonic function 
When the hermitian matrix of u is positive-definite and class , we call u a strict plurisubharmonic function.

(Weakly) pseudoconvex (p-pseudoconvex) 
Weak pseudoconvex is defined as : Let  be a domain. One says that X is pseudoconvex if there exists a continuous plurisubharmonic function  on X such that the set  is a relatively compact subset of X for all real numbers x.  i.e. there exists a smooth plurisubharmonic exhaustion function . Often, the definition of pseudoconvex is used here and is written as; Let X be a complex n-dimensional manifold. Then is said to be weeak pseudoconvex there exists a smooth plurisubharmonic exhaustion function .

Strongly (Strictly) pseudoconvex 
Let X be a complex n-dimensional manifold. Strongly pseudoconvex if there exists a smooth strictly plurisubharmonic exhaustion function ,i.e.,  is positive definite at every point. The strongly pseudoconvex domain is the pseudoconvex domain. The strong Levi pseudoconvex domain is simply called strong pseudoconvex and is often called strictly pseudoconvex to make it clear that it has a strictly plurisubharmonic exhaustion function in relation to the fact that it may not have a strictly plurisubharmonic exhaustion function.

(Weakly) Levi(–Krzoska) pseudoconvexity 

, we have

For arbitrary complex manifold, Levi (–Krzoska) pseudoconvexity does not always have an plurisubharmonic exhaustion function, i.e. it does not necessarily have a (p-)pseudoconvex domain.

If D does not have a  boundary, the following approximation result can be useful.

Proposition 1 If D is pseudoconvex, then there exist bounded, strongly Levi pseudoconvex domains  with class -boundary which are relatively compact in D, such that

Strongly Levi (–Krzoska) pseudoconvex (Strongly pseudoconvex) 
When the Levi (–Krzoska) form is positive-definite, it is called strongly Levi (–Krzoska) pseudoconvex or often called simply strongly pseudoconvex.

Levi total pseudoconvex 
Domain D that satisfies these conditions is called Levi total pseudoconvex.

Oka pseudoconvex

Family of Oka's disk 

Definition 
When  holds on any family of Oka's disk, D is called Oka pseudoconvex.

Locally pseudoconvex (locally Stein, Cartan pseudoconvex, local Levi property) 
For every point  there exist a neighbourhood U of x and f holomorphic. ( i.e.  be holomorphically convex.) such that f cannot be extended to any neighbourhood of x. i.e., let  be a holomorphic map, if every point  has a neighborhood U such that  admits a -plurisubharmonic exhaustion function (weakly 1-complete), in this situation, we call that X is locally pseudoconvex (or locally Stein) over Y. As an old name, it is also called Cartan pseudoconvex. In  the locally pseudoconvex domain is itself a pseudoconvex domain and it is a domain of holomorphy.

Conditions equivalent to domain of holomorphy 
For a domain  the following conditions are equivalent.:
 D is a domain of holomorphy.
 D is holomorphically convex.
 D is the union of an increasing sequence of analytic polyhedrons in D.
 D is pseudoconvex.
 D is Locally pseudoconvex.

Proving , i.e. constructing a global holomorphic function which admits no extension from non-extendable functions defined only locally.

Sheaf

Idéal de domaines indéterminés (The predecessor of the notion of the coherent (sheaf)) 
Oka introduced the notion which he termed "idéal de domaines indéterminés" or "ideal of indeterminate domains". Specifically, it is a set  of pairs ,  holomorphic on a non-empty open set , such that
 For each , then 

The origin of indeterminate domains comes from the fact that domains change depending on the pair . Cartan translated this notion into the notion of the coherent (sheaf) (Especially, coherent analytic sheaf) in sheaf cohomology. This name comes from 
H. Cartan. Also, Serre (1955) introduced the notion of the coherent sheaf into algebraic geometry, that is, the notion of the coherent algebraic sheaf. The notion of coherent (coherent sheaf cohomology) helped solve the problems in several complex variables.

Coherent sheaf

Definition 
The definition of the coherent sheaf is as follows.
A quasi-coherent sheaf on a ringed space  is a sheaf  of -modules which has a local presentation, that is, every point in  has an open neighborhood  in which there is an exact sequence

A coherent sheaf on a ringed space  is a sheaf  satisfying the following two properties:

Morphisms between (quasi-)coherent sheaves are the same as morphisms of sheaves of -modules.

Also, Jean-Pierre Serre (1955) proves that

If in an exact sequence  of sheaves of -modules two of the three sheaves  are coherent, then the third is coherent as well.

(Oka–Cartan) coherent theorem 
(Oka–Cartan) coherent theorem says that each sheaf that meets the following conditions is a coherent.

(Cartan 1950)
 the normalization of the structure sheaf of a complex analytic space
From the above Serre(1955) theorem,  is a coherent sheaf, also, (i) is used to prove Cartan's theorems A and B.

Cousin problem 
In the case of one variable complex functions, Mittag-Leffler's theorem was able to create a global meromorphic function from a given and principal parts (Cousin I problem), and Weierstrass factorization theorem was able to create a global meromorphic function from a given zeroes or zero-locus (Cousin II problem). However, these theorems do not hold because the singularities of analytic function in several complex variables is not isolated points, this problem is called the Cousin problem and is formulated in sheaf cohomology terms. They were introduced in special cases by Pierre Cousin in 1895. It was Oka who showed the conditions for solving first Cousin problem for the domain of holomorphy on the complex coordinate space, and also solving the second Cousin problem with additional topological assumptions, the Cousin problem is a problem related to the analytical properties of complex manifolds, but the only obstructions to solving problems of a complex analytic propertie a pure topological, and Serre called this the 
Oka principle. They are now posed, and solved, for arbitrary complex manifold M, in terms of conditions on M. M, which satisfies these conditions, is one way to define a Stein manifold. The study of the cousin's problem made us realize that in the study of several complex variables, it is possible to study of global properties from the patching of local data, that is it has developed the theory of sheaf cohomology. (e.g.Cartan seminar.)

First Cousin problem

Definition without sheaf cohomology words 
Each difference  is a holomorphic function, where it is defined. It asks for a meromorphic function f on M such that  is holomorphic on Ui; in other words, that f shares the singular behaviour of the given local function.

Definition using sheaf cohomology words 

Let K be the sheaf of meromorphic functions and O the sheaf of holomorphic functions on M. If the next map is surjective, Cousin first problem can be solved.

By the long exact cohomology sequence,

is exact, and so the first Cousin problem is always solvable provided that the first cohomology group H1(M,O) vanishes. In particular, by Cartan's theorem B, the Cousin problem is always solvable if M is a Stein manifold.

Second Cousin problem

Definition without Sheaf cohomology words 
Each ratio  is a non-vanishing holomorphic function, where it is defined. It asks for a meromorphic function f on M such that  is holomorphic and non-vanishing.

Definition using sheaf cohomology words 
let  be the sheaf of holomorphic functions that vanish nowhere, and  the sheaf of meromorphic functions that are not identically zero. These are both then sheaves of abelian groups, and the quotient sheaf  is well-defined. If the next map  is surjective, then Second Cousin problem can be solved.

The long exact sheaf cohomology sequence associated to the quotient is

so the second Cousin problem is solvable in all cases provided that 

The cohomology group  for the multiplicative structure on  can be compared with the cohomology group  with its additive structure by taking a logarithm. That is, there is an exact sequence of sheaves

where the leftmost sheaf is the locally constant sheaf with fiber .

When M is a Stein manifold, the middle arrow is an isomorphism because  for  so that a necessary and sufficient condition in that case for the second Cousin problem to be always solvable is that  (This condition called Oka principle.)

Manifolds and analytic varieties with several complex variables

Stein manifold (non-compact complex manifold) 
Since a non-compact (open) Riemann surface always has a non-constant single-valued holomorphic function, and satisfies the second axiom of countability, the open Riemann surface is in fact a 1-dimensional complex manifold possessing a holomorphic mapping into the complex plane . (In fact, Gunning and Narasimhan have shown (1967) that every non-compact Riemann surface actually has a holomorphic immersion into the complex plane. In other words, there is a holomorphic mapping into the complex plane whose derivative never vanishes.) For example, for an arbitrary compact connected complex manifold X, every holomorphic function on it is constant by Liouville's theorem, and so it cannot have any embedding into complex n-space. That is, for several complex variables, arbitrary complex manifolds do not always have holomorphic functions that are not constants. So, consider the conditions under which a complex manifold has a holomorphic function that is not a constant. Now if we had a holomorphic embedding of X into , then the coordinate functions of  would restrict to nonconstant holomorphic functions on X, contradicting compactness, except in the case that X is just a point. Complex manifolds that can be holomorphic embedded into  are called Stein manifolds. Also Stein manifolds satisfy the second axiom of countability.

A Stein manifold is a complex submanifold of the vector space of n complex dimensions. They were introduced by and named after Karl Stein (1951). A Stein space is similar to a Stein manifold but is allowed to have singularities. Stein spaces are the analogues of affine varieties or affine schemes in algebraic geometry. Therefore, the Stein manifold is the properties of the domain of definition of the (maximal) analytic continuation of an analytic function.

Definition 
Suppose X is a paracompact complex manifolds of complex dimension  and let  denote the ring of holomorphic functions on X. We call X a Stein manifold if the following conditions hold:
X is holomorphically convex, i.e. for every compact subset , the so-called holomorphically convex hull,

is also a compact subset of X.
X is holomorphically separable, i.e. if  are two points in X, then there exists  such that 

Note that condition (3) can be derived from conditions (1) and (2).

Every non-compact (open) Riemann surface is a Stein manifold 

Let X be a connected, non-compact (open) Riemann surface. A deep theorem of Behnke and Stein (1948) asserts that X is a Stein manifold.

Another result, attributed to Hans Grauert and Helmut Röhrl (1956), states moreover that every holomorphic vector bundle on X is trivial. In particular, every line bundle is trivial, so . The exponential sheaf sequence leads to the following exact sequence:

Now Cartan's theorem B shows that , therefore .

This is related to the solution of the second (multiplicative) Cousin problem.

Levi problems 
Cartan extended Levi's problem to Stein manifolds.
If the relative compact open subset  of the Stein manifold X is a Locally pseudoconvex, then D is a Stein manifold, and conversely, if D is a Locally pseudoconvex, then X is a Stein manifold. i.e. Then X is a Stein manifold if and only if D is locally the Stein manifold.

This was proved by Bremermann by embedding it in a sufficiently high dimensional , and reducing it to the result of Oka.

Also, Grauert proved for arbitrary complex manifolds M.
If the relative compact subset  of a arbitrary complex manifold M is a strongly pseudoconvex on M, then M is a holomorphically convex (i.e. Stein manifold). Also, D is itself a Stein manifold.

And Narasimhan extended Levi's problem to Complex analytic space, a generalized in the singular case of complex manifolds.
A Complex analytic space which admits a continuous strictly plurisubharmonic exhaustion function (i.e.strongly pseudoconvex) is Stein space.

Levi's problem remains unresolved in the following cases;	

Suppose that X is a singular Stein space,  . Suppose that for all  there is an open neighborhood  so that  is Stein space. Is D itself Stein?

more generalized

Suppose that N be a Stein space and f an injective, and also  a Riemann unbranched domain, such that map f is a locally pseudoconvex map (i.e. Stein morphism). Then M is itself Stein ?

and also,

Suppose that X be a Stein space and  an increasing union of Stein open sets. Then D is itself Stein ?

This means that Behnke–Stein theorem, which holds for Stein manifolds, has not found a conditions to be established in Stein space.

K-complete 
Grauert introduced the concept of K-complete in the proof of Levi's problem.

This concept also applies to complex analytic space.

Properties and examples of Stein manifolds 
 The standard complex space  is a Stein manifold.
 It can be shown quite easily that every closed complex submanifold of a Stein manifold is a Stein manifold, too.
 The embedding theorem for Stein manifolds states the following: Every Stein manifold X of complex dimension n can be embedded into  by a biholomorphic proper map.

These facts imply that a Stein manifold is a closed complex submanifold of complex space, whose complex structure is that of the ambient space (because the embedding is biholomorphic).
 Every Stein manifold of (complex) dimension n has the homotopy type of an n-dimensional CW-Complex.
 In one complex dimension the Stein condition can be simplified: a connected Riemann surface is a Stein manifold if and only if it is not compact. This can be proved using a version of the Runge theorem for Riemann surfaces, due to Behnke and Stein.
 Every Stein manifold X is holomorphically spreadable, i.e. for every point , there are n holomorphic functions defined on all of X which form a local coordinate system when restricted to some open neighborhood of x.
 The first Cousin problem can always be solved on a Stein manifold.
 Being a Stein manifold is equivalent to being a (complex) strongly pseudoconvex manifold. This is a solution to the so-called Levi problem, named after E. E. Levi (1911). The function  invites a generalization of Stein manifold to the idea of a corresponding class of compact complex manifolds with boundary called Stein domain. A Stein domain is the preimage . Some authors call such manifolds therefore strictly pseudoconvex manifolds.
Related to the previous item, another equivalent and more topological definition in complex dimension 2 is the following: a Stein surface is a complex surface X with a real-valued Morse function f on X such that, away from the critical points of f, the field of complex tangencies to the preimage  is a contact structure that induces an orientation on Xc agreeing with the usual orientation as the boundary of  That is,  is a Stein filling of Xc.

Numerous further characterizations of such manifolds exist, in particular capturing the property of their having "many" holomorphic functions taking values in the complex numbers. See for example Cartan's theorems A and B, relating to sheaf cohomology.

In the GAGA set of analogies, Stein manifolds correspond to affine varieties.

Stein manifolds are in some sense dual to the elliptic manifolds in complex analysis which admit "many" holomorphic functions from the complex numbers into themselves. It is known that a Stein manifold is elliptic if and only if it is fibrant in the sense of so-called "holomorphic homotopy theory".

Complex projective varieties (compact complex manifold) 
Meromorphic function in one-variable complex function were studied in a 
compact (closed) Riemann surface, because since the Riemann-Roch theorem (Riemann's inequality) holds for compact Riemann surfaces (Therefore the theory of compact Riemann surface can be regarded as the theory of algebraic curve over ). In fact, compact Riemann surface had a non-constant single-valued meromorphic function, and also a compact Riemann surface had enough meromorphic functions. A compact one-dimensional complex manifold was a Riemann sphere . However, for the high-dimensional compact complex manifolds, the existence of meromorphic functions and classification of meromorphic function cannot be easily verified because in several complex variable cannot have isolated singularities. Furthermore, the abstract notion of a compact Riemann surface is algebraizable (The Riemann's existence theorem, Kodaira embedding theorem.), but it is not easy to verify which compact analytic spaces are algebraizable. In fact, Hopf found a class of compact complex manifolds without nonconstant meromorphic functions..However, there is a Siegel result that gives the necessary conditions for compact complex manifolds to be algebraic. The generalization of the Riemann-Roch theorem to several complex variables was first extended by Kodaira to compact analytic surfaces, and then to three-dimensional, and then n-dimensional Kähler varieties. Serre formulated the Riemann-Roch theorem as a problem of dimension of coherent sheaf cohomology, and also Serre proved Serre duality. Cartan-Serre proved the following property: the cohomology group is finite-dimensional for a coherent sheaf on a compact complex manifold M. Hirzebruch generalized the theorem for compact complex manifolds in 1994 (The Hirzebruch–Riemann–Roch theorem) and Grothendieck more generalized it (The Grothendieck–Hirzebruch–Riemann–Roch theorem). In the high-dimensional (compact) complex manifolds, the phenomenon that the sheaf cohomology group vanishing occurs, then the existence condition of meromorphic function can be given by calculating the numerical value of the topological invariant, by using generalized the Riemann-Roch theorem, and it is the Kodaira vanishing theorem and its generalization Nakano vanishing theorem etc. that gives the condition of when the sheaf cohomology group vanishing. Regarding whether the complex analytic sub-space(variety) of the complex projective space is algebraizable, Serre's GAGA theorem is known. For example, Kodaira embedding theorem says that a compact Kähler manifold M, with a Hodge metric, there is a complex-analytic embedding of M into complex projective space of enough high-dimension N. Chow's theorem shows that the complex analytic subspace (subvariety) of a closed complex projective space to be an algebraic that is, so it is the common zero of some homogeneous polynomials, such a relationship is one example of what is called Serre's GAGA principle. Then combined with Kodaira's result, a compact Kähler manifold M embeds as an algebraic variety. This gives an example of a complex manifold with enough meromorphic functions. Similarities in the Levi problems on the complex projective space , have been proved in some patterns, for example by Takeuchi. Broadly, the GAGA principle says that the geometry of projective complex analytic spaces (or manifolds) is equivalent to the geometry of projective complex varieties. The combination of analytic and algebraic methods for complex projective varieties lead to areas such as Hodge theory. Also, the deformation theory of compact complex manifolds has developed as Kodaira–Spencer theory. However, despite being a compact complex manifold, there are counterexample of that cannot be embedded in projective space and are not algebraic.

See also
Complex geometry
CR manifold
Harmonic maps
Harmonic morphisms
Infinite-dimensional holomorphy
Oka–Weil theorem

Annotation

References

Inline citations

Textbooks

Encyclopedia of Mathematics

Further reading

External links
 Tasty Bits of Several Complex Variables open source book by Jiří Lebl
 Complex Analytic and Differential Geometry (OpenContent book See B2)
 
 Victor Guillemin. 18.117 Topics in Several Complex Variables. Spring 2005. Massachusetts Institute of Technology: MIT OpenCourseWare, https://ocw.mit.edu. License: Creative Commons BY-NC-SA.

 
Multivariable calculus